Leave It to Blanche is a 1934 British comedy film directed by Harold Young and starring Henry Kendall, Olive Blakeney and Miki Hood. It was made at Teddington Studios by the British subsidiary of Warner Brothers.

Cast
 Henry Kendall as Peter Manners  
 Olive Blakeney as Blanche Wetherby  
 Miki Hood as Doris Manners  
 Griffith Jones as Philip Amesbury  
 Rex Harrison as Ronnie  
 Hamilton Keene as Brewster 
 Julian Royce as Patteridge  
 Elizabeth Jenns as Blossom  
 Harold Warrender as Guardee  
 Phyllis Stanley as Singer

References

Bibliography
 Low, Rachael. Filmmaking in 1930s Britain. George Allen & Unwin, 1985.
 Wood, Linda. British Films, 1927-1939. British Film Institute, 1986.

External links

1934 films
British comedy films
1934 comedy films
Films shot at Teddington Studios
Films set in England
Films directed by Harold Young
Warner Bros. films
British black-and-white films
1930s English-language films
1930s British films